Deep Space Industries, or DSI, was an American privately-held company operating in the space technology and space exploration sectors. It was acquired on January 1, 2019 by Bradford Space.

The company is developing and building spacecraft technology that allows private companies and government agencies to access destinations throughout the solar system. DSI's goal is to access to deep space and substantially lower the cost of doing so.

History
DSI was formally announced on January 22, 2013. DSI spent 3-½ years investigating the feasibility of space resource utilization.  In late 2015, DSI received venture funding  to begin the development of a propulsion system and spacecraft capable of traveling from low Earth orbit (LEO) to deep space on its own.

, the company CEO was David Gump, previously of Transformational Space Corporation and Astrobotic Technology. Chairman Rick N. Tumlinson is a founder of the Space Frontier Foundation, among other organizations in the field of space exploration. 
Sometime prior to August 2016, Daniel Faber became the CEO. In January 2017 DSI named Bill Miller as Chief Executive Officer. Miller is a startup strategist.

Spacecraft and technologies 

As of June 2018, Deep Space Industries is working on a series of technologies that aim to lower the cost of access to high earth orbits and deep space for private companies and government agencies.

Xplorer is a spacecraft that is designed to use its own propulsion system to travel from low Earth orbit (LEO) to an Earth departure trajectory or higher Earth orbits such as geostationary orbit (GEO). Xplorer is built to enable exploration and high delta-V applications within low Earth orbits, geosynchronous orbit, near-Earth asteroids, and deep space destinations such as Lunar orbits, Venus, or Mars.

Xplorer is equipped to give a 10 kg payload a delta-V capability of approximately 5 km/s, with greater payload masses possible at lower delta-V requirements. Xplorer also provides deep space communications, navigation, attitude control, thermal control, and payload power. Xplorer's Reaction Control System gives six degrees of freedom to maneuver close to celestial objects. Xplorer is capable of  launching on a variety of commercial rideshares to low Earth orbit, and decouples launch timing from orbit raising and Earth departure maneuvers.

Comet is a launch-safe electrothermal propulsion system designed for orbit raising, life extension, and de-orbit. It uses water as a propellant, and is scalable for CubeSats to small micro-satellites, with a flexible interface suitable for a wide range of spacecraft. The system is approved to fly on multiple launch vehicles as part of a secondary or rideshare spacecraft.

Criticism

The announcement of DSI was met with both praise and criticism. Several unnamed scientists have questioned whether cost-effective asteroid mining could even be accomplished given competition in Earth terrestrial markets and the high cost of returning high-value minerals to Earth. However, DSI has responded to these statements by stating that the majority of the materials mined—principally water—would be destined for use in space, thus avoiding the enormous fuel costs of repeatedly returning to and escaping from Earth's gravitational field, and additionally, that servicing communications satellite constellations could earn the company $5 to 8 million per month.

Whether Deep Space Industries would be competing in similar services as Planetary Resources was also questioned. In particular, Planetary Resources has not released information on their intentions for processing, power generation, or in-space manufacturing hardware and equipment. Deep Space Industries has not yet announced its spacecraft manufacturing partnerships for the FireFly 1.

See also

 Asteroid mining
 In situ resource utilization
 Mining the Sky
 Planetary Resources
 Shackleton Energy Company
 Space manufacturing
 Space technology
 Space trade
 Space-based economy
 SpaceDev

References

External links

 Press conference, Jan 22 2013 – 103-min video
 Asteroid Mining 1 session, National Space Society ISDC 2013 conference – 15 June 2013.  DSI CEO D. Gump speaks 15:00–28:30, followed by Q&A from the audience.
 Illustrated concept – 9-picture gallery

2013 establishments in Virginia
Aerospace companies of the United States
Asteroid mining
American companies established in 2013
Private spaceflight companies
Mining companies of the United States